H-Wonder is a Japanese music arranger and composer. He debuted in 1995. In June 1998, he stopped being a solo artist and changed his name to H-Wonder and became a composer. One of his notable collaborations is with Maaya Sakamoto and BoA.

Discography

Singles 
 Subete Konomama Dakishimereba - 24 March 1995
 Ready Steady Go! - 23 August 1995
 Mystic Eyes - 24 April 1996 (Ending theme for the anime series The Vision of Escaflowne)
 Sugita Koi no Ato - 7 November 1996
 Dawn - 21 February 1997
 Chocolate Parfait - 17 December 1997
 Kitto Daijobu - 1 April 1998
 Happy - 30 September 1998 (Only sold in Hokkaido)

Albums 
 Dawn-bright - 24 April 1997
 Wonder Hero 2: Brand New Atlas - 21 June 1996
 Wonder Hero - 21 April 1995

Collaborations 
 On/Off - Arranger
  - Opening for Vampire Knight
 Maaya Sakamoto - Composer and arranger
  - Ending for Tsubasa Chronicle
 
 "Action!" - Opening theme for Clamp in Wonderland 2
 
 "That is to Say!" - Follow me Up Album]
 BoA - Composer and arranger for some songs
 "Every Heart (Minna no Kimochi)" - Arranger
 "Beside You (Boku o Yobu Koe)" - Arranger
 "Quincy" - Arranger
 "Key of Heart" - Composer and arranger
 "Beautiful Flowers" - Arranger
 Max - Arranger
 "Spring Rain"
 Kōmi Hirose - Arranger
 "Velvet"
 "The Shining Story"
 "Sayonara"
 Folder5 - Composer and arranger for some songs
 "Fake" - Composer and arranger
 "Magical Eyes (Mochi2wondermix)" - Arranger
Koda Kumi - Arranger for some songs
 "Cutie Honey" - Opening Theme Song for the anime Re: Cutie Honey
"into your heart" - Ending Theme Song for the anime Re: Cutie Honey

External links 
 h-wonder at Scoop Music 

1968 births
Japanese composers
Japanese male composers
Japanese male singers
Japanese music arrangers
Living people
Musicians from Chiba Prefecture
People from Funabashi